Melanie Robillard (born October 3, 1982 in Sussex, New Brunswick) is a curler originally from Ottawa, Ontario, Canada. She represented Germany at the Vancouver 2010 Winter Olympic Games, playing third for Andrea Schöpp. Currently, she lives in Switzerland.

Career
As a junior, Robillard curled for Jenn Hanna's team in 2000 as her lead. The rink would lose in the Ontario provincial junior finals that year, to Julie Reddick. In 2002, Robillard skipped her team to the provincial junior finals, but lost once again to Reddick. Robillard, who has a German mother, officially played alternate for the German team at the 2008 Ford World Women's Curling Championship, but ended up playing second for seven of the eleven matches. Later in the year, she played lead for the German mixed team that won the gold medal at the 2008 European Mixed Curling Championship. She competed on the German women's teams, skipped by Andrea Schöpp, as third in the 2010 Winter Olympics, and in the 2010 Ford World Women's Curling Championship, which they won.

In 2011, she coached both the Spanish men's and women's teams at the European Curling Championships.

Personal life
Robillard formerly studied law at the Université Libre de Bruxelles. She  worked as a Compliance Officer for an investment firm. She speaks French, English, German and Spanish. She is married to fellow curler Antonio Mollinedo.

In 2005, Robillard posed topless for a calendar to promote women's curling.

See also
 Ana Arce
 Daniela Jentsch
 Lynsay Ryan
 Kasia Selwand
 Claudia Toth

References

External links
 

Living people
1982 births
Curlers from Ottawa
Canadian women curlers
Franco-Ontarian people
German female curlers
Canadian people of German descent
Curlers at the 2010 Winter Olympics
Olympic curlers of Germany
World curling champions
Spanish female curlers
European curling champions